The 1956 United States presidential election in Washington took place on November 6, 1956, as part of the 1956 United States presidential election. Voters chose nine representatives, or electors, to the Electoral College, who voted for president and vice president.

Washington was won by incumbent President Dwight D. Eisenhower (R–Pennsylvania), running with Vice President Richard Nixon, with 53.91% of the popular vote, against Adlai Stevenson (D–Illinois), running with Senator Estes Kefauver, with 45.44% of the popular vote.

Results

Results by county

See also
 United States presidential elections in Washington (state)

Notes

References

Washington (state)
1956
1956 Washington (state) elections